Zemia is a Bulgarian newspaper published by Euromedia which covers agriculture and news. The newspaper is produced Monday to Friday, with added sections on Thursday and Friday.

History
The first edition of the newspaper was launched on 1951 when the newspaper was called "Za kooperativno zemedelie" (Cooperative agriculture). The first director was Kosta Andreev. From 1958 to 1990 the newspaper was called "Cooperativno selo" (Cooperative village) and since 1990 it has been called Zemia.

Sections
 News in Bulgaria
 News at The World
 Economy
 Culture
 Farming
 Sport
 Interview
 Music
 View
 Directory
 Humor
 Internet

Additional sections
The following additional sections appear in the Thursday and Friday editions of the newspaper.
 Trakia (Region in Bulgaria)
 Kooperacia (Farming)
 Stadion (Stadium)
 Goliamata politica (The big politics)
 Za gradinata (For the garden)
Articles about plants and flowers in your garden, pictures with gardens from all over the world.
 Kitai dnes (China today)
In this Additional it writes about the politics, the news, the new projects, the foreign relationships of China

References

1951 establishments in Bulgaria
Bulgarian-language newspapers
Mass media in Sofia
Daily newspapers published in Bulgaria
Publications established in 1951